The Men's singles event of badminton at the 2010 Commonwealth Games was held from 9 October – 14 October 2010 in Siri Fort Sports Complex, New Delhi, India.

Men's singles

References
Reports

Badminton at the 2010 Commonwealth Games